Shujaat Azeem (born November 9, 1951) was Special Assistant/Advisor to Prime Minister of Pakistan Mian Muhammad Nawaz Sharif on Aviation (2013–2016).

He is a Pakistani businessman, aviation expert and a pilot.

Education
 O Levels 1967
 Bachelor of Sciences in Avionics from Peshawar University 
 Airline Transport Pilot License and FAA Licenses from USA

Career
Shujaat Azeem started his career in Aviation as a Pakistan Air Force General Duty Pilot. He joined the service in 1968 and continued to serve till 1979. He was dismissed from the service after a court martial. He then proceeded to the United States where he obtained his commercial pilots license and certifications from the United States.

 1968-1979 	PAF General Duty Pilot 
 1980-1997 	Pilot of H.E. Rafic Hariri PM of Lebanon
 1997 		Chief Executive Officer, Apollo Telecom
 1999		Chief Executive Officer, Unicus Business Services
 2005		Chief Executive Officer, Sukh Chayn Gardens
 2005		Chief Executive Officer, Royal Airport Services
 2013 – 2014	Advisor to the Prime Minister of Pakistan Mr. Mohammad Nawaz Sharif on Aviation
 2014 – 2016 Special Assistant to the Prime Minister of Pakistan on Aviation

Pilot - Prime Minister of Lebanon
Azeem joined the service of His Excellency Rafic Hariri, Prime Minister of Lebanon as Pilot in 1980. He continued to serve with His Excellency for 17 years. On his return to Pakistan in 1997, he continued his engagement with the Aviation sector, moving into Aviation Management.

Business
He has built several successful national and international multimillion-dollar businesses in his career in Pakistan – Apollo Telecom, Unicus Business Services, Royal Airport Services and Sukh Chayne Gardens. In 1992, Shujaat Azeem founded Apollo Telecom (Pvt.) Ltd., one of Pakistan's leading technology solution providers. During his time in Apollo, Azeem held the positions of CEO and President. In 1994, his company was the technology provider to Pakistan Telecommunication Company Limited (PTCL) to establish the first Public Data Network for the first full service Internet Service Provider (ISP) in Pakistan, which went live in 1995. In 1999, he established Unicus Business Services (Pvt.) Ltd. and worked there as its CEO. Unicus, in a joint venture won the UFone GSM Contract, establishing the countrywide UFone network infrastructure.

Special Assistant/Advisory to Prime Minister of Pakistan
During his tenure as the Advisor and Special Assistant no improvements could be made in PIA which was the major task assigned to him as advisor. However, due to the concerted effort put in by the DG CAA, Air Marshal (Rtd) Muhammad Yousaf, following projects were completed in the Civil Aviation Auuthority. The new Multan International Airport was inaugurated, Islamabad International Airport and the Hajj Lounge, Lahore were renovated, Quetta International Airport was established and expansion of the Faisalabad International Airport was initiated. Azeem led the introduction of technology in aviation management by upgrading the Radio Navigation Aids and Instrument landing system, replacing passenger aero-bridges in Karachi, installing Integrated Security Systems and installation of Equipment/ Scanners at Karachi, Lahore & Islamabad International Airports. He also introduced 360 Degree Aerodrome Simulators for training centers and invested in human capital development.

Pakistan National Aviation Policy 2015
He is responsible for the development of the Pakistan National Aviation Policy 2015, focusing on the reform and development of the aviation sector of Pakistan. Although a concerted campaign was started to show Aviation Policy as a game changer, it failed to bring any improvement in the aviation industry.  Owing to clash of interest he was too generous to give landing rights to some of the middle east airlines which badly harmed the PIA and other Pakistani airlines. Today aviation sector in Pakistan is barely surviving and a new and well-thought out Aviation Policy is need of the hour.

Challenges
The inherited challenges of PIA due to low performance, high salaries of experts, security situations at the airport, and open sky policies. But PIA situation went from bad to worse and he had to resign twice when his appointment was challenged in the Supreme Court of Pakistan on his eligibility for the position as Special Assistant due to dismissal from Pakistan Air Force after a Court Martial.

Philanthropy 
Shujaat Azeem, funds and operates many different philanthropic initiatives in the education, shelter, poverty alleviation, and food security sectors. His endeavours aim to bring about sustainable change for the betterment of the people. In 2011, he established a model village in Rajanpur, Punjab consisting of 270 houses and provided vocational and other allied facilities to the residents of the village. He also runs a free education institution, in Pakistan's capital city, Islamabad, which provides free quality primary and secondary education to students. Azeem, also runs food security programs and has established a sustenance fund for widows

Sukh Chayn Gardens
In 2004 Azeem established a state-of-the-art housing scheme in Lahore, Pakistan, Sukh Chayn Gardens (Pvt.) Ltd. The scheme is built on canal road a famous landmark of the city. The scheme was established to provide quality housing and superior services and infrastructure to the residents of this historical city. Azeem built the colony enabled with technology like sensor based garbage collection, addressed security needs by introducing constant manned and dog patrols, and dedicated 50% of the area as green-areas to preserve and enrich the environment.  The colony is also host to a replica of The Blue Mosque Istanbul. This one of a kind Mosque in Pakistan was constructed by Turkish artisans and inaugurated jointly by the Prime Ministers of Pakistan and China.

References

External links
 
 Official site of Sukh Chayn Gardens
 Sukh Chayn Coffee Table Book

Nawaz Sharif administration
Pakistani businesspeople
1951 births
Living people
Pakistani aviators